Below is a list of current Oceanian swimming records as ratified by the continental governing body Oceania Swimming Association.

Currently, Australian swimmers hold all but 6 individual Oceanian records, held by New Zealanders Moss Burmester, Lewis Clareburt and Lauren Boyle:
the men's long-course and short-course 200m butterfly which are both held by Moss Burmester.
the men's long-course 400m individual medley which is held by Lewis Clareburt.
the women's short-course 800m freestyle, and long-course and short-course 1500m freestyle which are all held by Lauren Boyle.

Long course (50 metres)

Men

Women

Mixed relay

Short course (25 metres)

Men

Women

Mixed relay

References

Oceania
Records
Swimming